High Times is an American monthly magazine (and cannabis brand) that advocates the legalization of cannabis as well as other counterculture ideas. The magazine was founded in 1974 by Tom Forcade. The magazine had its own book publishing division, High Times Books, and its own record label, High Times Records.

From 1974 to 2016, High Times was published by Trans High Corporation (THC). Hightimes Holding Corp. took over the parent company and magazine in 2017.

Overview 
High Times features cutting-edge journalism covering a wide range of topics, including politics, activism, drugs, sex, music, and film; as well as high-quality photography.

Like Playboy, each issue of High Times contains a centerfold photo; however, instead of a nude woman, High Times typically features a cannabis plant.

Publication history

Origins 
Forçade's previous attempt — via the Underground Press Syndicate/Alternative Press Syndicate — to reach a wide counterculture audience of underground papers had failed, even though he had the support of several noteworthy writers, photographers, and artists. Through High Times, Forçade was able to get his message to the masses without relying on mainstream media. Forçade was quoted as saying, "Those cavemen must've been stoned, no pun intended."

High Times was originally meant to be a joke: a single-issue lampoon of Playboy, substituting marijuana for sex. The first issue appeared in the summer of 1974.

The magazine's first editor was Ed Dwyer, who had earlier written the text of the Woodstock music festival program booklet as well as the Woodstock film program booklet). The magazine was initially distributed by Homestead Book Company and Big Rapids Distribution.

High Times was at the beginning funded by drug money from the sale of illegal marijuana, But the magazine found an audience, becoming a monthly publication with a growing circulation, and the staff quickly grew to 40 people.

Financial struggles and legal battles 
High Times founder Forçade committed suicide in November 1978. He bequeathed trusts to benefit High Times and the National Organization for the Reform of Marijuana Laws (NORML). (High Times had been a supporter of NORML since the organization's founding in 1970.)

Following Forçade's death, under the editorship of Larry Sloman (from 1979 to 1984),
the magazine consistently struggled against marijuana prohibition laws, and fought to keep itself alive and publishing in an anti-cannabis atmosphere. Reflecting the time period, High Times began to feature positive coverage of cocaine as a recreational drug.

The magazine's former associate publisher, Rick Cusick, said the only way High Times managed to stay in business and never miss a publication date for over four decades was, "Really, really good lawyers, even though everybody knew I was talking about just one — Michael Kennedy." Michael John Kennedy served as the General Counsel and Chairman of the Board for High Times for over 40 years until his death in 2016, when his wife and board member, Eleanora Kennedy, took the reins.

Mainstream success and the Hager era 
In 1987, High Times was audited by ABC as reaching 500,000 copies an issue, rivaling Rolling Stone and National Lampoon.

In 1988, Steven Hager was hired as the magazine's editor. He is most famous for removing the promotion of hard drugs (e.g., cocaine and heroin) from the magazine, and instead concentrating on advocating personal cultivation of cannabis. Hager became the first editor to publish and promote the work of hemp activist Jack Herer.

In 1988, under Hager's leadership, the magazine created the Cannabis Cup, a cannabis awards ceremony held every Thanksgiving in Amsterdam that later expanded to a number of U.S. cities. He also formed the High Times Freedom Fighters, the first hemp legalization group. The High Times Freedom Fighters were famous for dressing up in Colonial outfits and organizing hemp rallies across the United States. One rally, The Boston Freedom Rally, quickly became the largest political event in the country, drawing an audience of over 100,000 to the Boston Common.

In 1997, the magazine and Hager founded the Counterculture Hall of Fame, with inductions were held annually on Thanksgiving as part of the Amsterdam Cannabis Cup event.

In the late 1980s Mike Edison began writing "Shoot the Tube," a featured column about television and politics for High Times.  In 1998 Edison was named the magazine's publisher, and later took control of the editorial side of the magazine as well. As editor and publisher, he caused a furor among staffers by putting Black Sabbath singer Ozzy Osbourne on the cover, and then leaking to the New York Posts Page Six gossip column that thousands of dollars of pot had gone missing from the photo shoot. After taking the magazine to new heights in sales and advertising, Edison was instrumental in producing High Times first feature film, High Times' Potluck. Edison left High Times in 2001.

In 2000, the magazine established the Stony Awards to recognize and celebrate notable stoner films and television episodes about cannabis. Six High Times Stony Awards ceremonies were held in New York City beginning in 2000, before the Stonys moved to Los Angeles in 2007. Award winners received a bong-shaped trophy. Starting in 2002, the Stonys presented the Thomas King Forçade Award for "stony achievement" in film.

Later developments 
In 2003, Steven Hager was fired by High Times' board of directors, as the magazine shifted focus from marijuana to more literary content, hiring John Buffalo Mailer as executive editor. A succession of editors followed, including David Bienenstock, Rick Cusick, and Steve Bloom. Mailer left the magazine within a year.

In 2004, High Times returned to its roots, releasing the CD High Volume: The Stoner Rock Collection. Hager was rehired, first as the creative director, and then in 2006, back in the position of editor-in-chief, but by 2009 he had returned to the role of creative director.

In November 2009, High Times celebrated its 35th anniversary.

Hager was again let go by the magazine in 2013, eventually suing High Times for defrauding him of his ownership shares in the company.

In October 2014, the magazine celebrated its 40th anniversary with a party attended by celebrities such as Susan Sarandon. In 2014, the High Times website was read by 500,000 to five million users each month.

Relocation to L.A. 
In January 2017, the magazine announced it would be permanently relocating from New York to Los Angeles. This followed the legalization of marijuana in several West Coast states, including California. In the summer of 2017, High Times was acquired by a group of investors led by Oreva Capital for $42 million.

High Times acquired cannabis media company Green Rush Daily, Inc. on April 5, 2018. The deal was valued at $6.9 million. Green Rush Daily founder Scott McGovern joined the magazine as Senior Executive Vice President.

The publication frequency of the magazine was reduced to quarterly in 2019. The print magazine was temporarily suspended after the publication of the April 2020 issue.

Columns 
 "Almost Infamous" by Bobby Black (2004–2016) — lifestyle and entertainment
 “Ask Ed: Your Marijuana Questions Answered" by Ed Rosenthal (1980s–1990s)
 "Brain Damage Report" by Paul Krassner (late 1970s–2000s)
 "Cannabis Column" by Jon Gettman
 "Chef Ra's Psychedelic Kitchen" by Chef Ra ( 1988– 2003)
 "Sex Pot" by Hyapatia Lee (from 2013)
 "The Stoned Gamer" by Alana Evans (from 2014) — gaming
 "Toasted Tweets" by Jessica Delfino (2016) — weekly cannabis-themed Twitter round-up

Comics 
By 1976, High Times was publishing comics in its pages, by the likes of underground comix creators like Gilbert Shelton ("The Fabulous Furry Freak Brothers"), Kim Deitch, Josh Alan and Drew Friedman, Bill Griffith ("Zippy the Pinhead"), Paul Kirchner ("Dope Rider"), Milton Knight ("Zoe"), Spain Rodriguez ("Trashman"), Dave Sheridan, Frank Thorne, and Skip Williamson ("Snappy Sammy Smoot"). Later, artists like Bob Fingerman and Mary Wilshire contributed comics to High Times as well.

Notable contributors and staff members 
Andrew Weil was a regular contributor to High Times from 1975 to 1983. For a time, William Levy served as the magazine's European editor.

In 1976, Bruce Eisner became a contributing editor for the magazine. Chip Berlet was the magazine's Washington, D.C. bureau chief in the Seventies. Jeff Goldberg was an editor in 1978–1979.

Kyle Kushman is a former cultivation reporter for High Times and has been a contributing writer for over 20 years.

Bobby Black had a long association with High Times, from 1994 to 2015, including being a senior editor and columnist. His involvement at High Times included production director and associate art director; writing the monthly lifestyle and entertainment column "Almost Infamous"; writing feature articles and interviews; creator and producer of the magazine's annual Miss High Times beauty pageant; producer and host of the annual High Times Doobie Awards for music; lead reporter, judge, and competition coordinator for the Cannabis Cup and the High Times Medical Cannabis Cup; and A&R, producer, liner notes and art director for High Volume: The Stoner Rock Collection CD (High Times Records).

At age 19, Zena Tsarfin started as an intern for the magazine. She later returned to High Times, serving as the magazine's managing editor until 2001 and then again from March 2006 to January 2007. From 2014 to 2016, Tsarfin was High Times' director of digital media.

Danny Danko is the magazine's former Senior Cultivation Editor.

The careers of a number of writers/editors from the comics industry overlapped with High Times, including Tsarfin, Josh Alan Friedman (High Times managing editor, 1983), Lou Stathis (High Times editor, late 1980s), Ann Nocenti (High Times editor, 2004), and most significantly, John Holmstrom, who began to work for the magazine as Managing Editor in 1987, was soon promoted to Executive Editor, and in 1991 was promoted to Publisher and President. In 1996 he stepped aside to launch and oversee the High Times website, and left the magazine for good in 2000.

Book publishing

 
 
 
 
 
 
 
 
 
 
 Raskin, Jonah. Marijuanaland: Dispatches from an American War (New York: High Times Books, 2011).

See also 
 Cannabis Cup
 High Times' Potluck
 Counterculture Hall of Fame
 Stony Awards
 High Times Medical Cannabis Cup

Notes

Further reading

External links

Lifestyle magazines published in the United States
Cannabis magazines
Cannabis media in the United States
Cannabis activism
Cannabis law in the United States
Drug control law
Monthly magazines published in the United States
Magazines established in 1974
Magazines published in New York City
1974 in cannabis
1974 establishments in New York (state)